Comet 29P/Schwassmann–Wachmann, also known as Schwassmann–Wachmann 1, was discovered on November 15, 1927, by Arnold Schwassmann and Arno Arthur Wachmann at the Hamburg Observatory in Bergedorf, Germany. It was discovered photographically, when the comet was in outburst and the magnitude was about 13. Precovery images of the comet from March 4, 1902, were found in 1931 and showed the comet at 12th magnitude.

The comet is unusual in that while normally hovering at around 16th magnitude, it suddenly undergoes an outburst. This causes the comet to brighten by 1 to 5 magnitudes. This happens with a frequency of 7.3 outbursts per year, fading within a week or two. The magnitude of the comet has been known to vary from 18th magnitude to 10th magnitude, a more than thousand-fold increase in brightness, during its brightest outbursts. On 14 January 2021, an outburst was observed with brightness from 16.6 to 15.0 magnitude, and consistent with the 7.3 outbursts per year noted earlier. Outbursts are very sudden, rising to maximum in about 2 hours, which is indicative of their cryovolcanic origin; and with the times of outburst modulated by an underlying 57-day periodicity possibly suggesting that its large nucleus is an extremely slow rotator.

The comet is a member of a relatively new class of objects called "Centaurs", of which at least 500 are known. These are small icy bodies with orbits between those of Jupiter and Neptune. Astronomers believe that Centaurs have been recently perturbed inward from the Kuiper belt, a disk of trans-Neptunian objects occupying a region extending from the orbit of Neptune to approximately 50 AU from the Sun. Frequent perturbations by Jupiter will likely accumulate and cause the comet to migrate either inward or outward by the year 4000. A number of Centaurs appear to be dynamically and perhaps even physically related to 29P; such objects may traverse the coma of 29P when in outburst. 

The dust and gas comprising the comet's nucleus is part of the same primordial materials from which the Sun and planets were formed billions of years ago. The complex carbon-rich molecules they contain may have provided some of the raw materials from which life originated on Earth.

The comet nucleus is estimated to be   in diameter.

29P reached perihelion on March 7, 2019. It came to opposition in late December 2022.

References

External links 
 Orbital simulation from JPL (Java) / Ephemeris
 29P/Schwassmann-Wachmann 1 – Seiichi Yoshida @ aerith.net
 29P monitoring campaign - British Astronomical Association COMET MISSION 29P website
 29P at CometBase
 29P at Las Cumbres Observatory (8 Feb 2010 12:23, 60 seconds)
 29P (Joseph Brimacombe April 18, 2013)

Periodic comets
0029

19271115